Danielle Ofri is an American essayist, editor, and practicing internist. She is an attending physician at Bellevue Hospital, and a clinical professor of medicine at the New York University School of Medicine. Her writing appears in The New Yorker, The New York Times, and The Lancet.

Early life 
Ofri was born in New York City. She received an undergraduate degree in physiology from McGill University in 1986. She graduated from the New York University School of Medicine with an M.D. and a Ph.D. in pharmacology. Her doctorate was on the biochemistry of opioid receptors in the laboratory of Dr. Eric Simon. She trained in internal medicine at Bellevue Hospital.

Writing and editing career

After completing her medical residency, Ofri began writing about her medical training at Bellevue Hospital, the oldest public hospital and one of the busiest urban hospitals in the country. These essays were published in literary journals and eventually formed the basis of her first book, Singular Intimacies: Becoming a Doctor at Bellevue.

Ofri returned to Bellevue Hospital as an attending physician in 1998, where she continues to teach and practice medicine. In 2000, Ofri co-founded the Bellevue Literary Review, the first literary magazine to arise from a hospital. It is considered the preeminent journal in its field. She remains editor-in-chief.

Ofri's writings have been included in Best American Essays 2002 and 2005, and Best American Science Writing 2003. Her essays and reviews have appeared in The New York Times, The New England Journal of Medicine, The Lancet, the Los Angeles Times, and on National Public Radio. She is the recipient of the McGovern award from the American Medical Writers Association for her contributions to medical literature. She received an honorary doctorate of humane letters from Curry College. She writes regularly for The New York Times health section about medicine and the doctor-patient connection.

Books

Ofri published her first book, Singular Intimacies: Becoming a Doctor at Bellevue, in 2001. The book traces her experiences in medical school and residency at an inner-city hospital. An essay from the book, "Merced", was chosen by Stephen Jay Gould for Best American Essays 2002, and was awarded the Editor's Prize for Nonfiction by The Missouri Review.

Her second book, Incidental Findings: Lessons from my Patients in the Art of Medicine, was published in 2005. It explores the subject of teaching medicine to the next generation of physicians, as well as Ofri’s experiences as a "locum tenens" physician in small town America. Ofri also writes about her own experience being a patient. The essay "Living Will" was selected by Susan Orlean for Best American Essays 2005. The essay "Common Ground" was selected by Oliver Sacks for Best American Science Writing 2003 and granted an honorable mention by Anne Fadiman in Best American Essays 2004.

Ofri released her third book, Medicine in Translation: Journeys with My Patients, in 2010. It discusses immigration and health care—two topics that dominated the public discourse in 2010. Ofri explores the cultural challenges in medicine and chronicles the experiences of immigrants and Americans in the U.S. health care system.

Her fourth book, What Doctors Feel: How Emotions Affect the Practice of Medicine, was published in 2013. This book examines the emotional side of medicine that impacts patient care. Ofri's fifth book, What Patients Say, What Doctors Hear, was published in 2017 and explores the doctor-patient conversation as the most powerful tool in medicine. Her sixth book, When We Do Harm; A Doctor Confronts Medical Error, was published in 2020 and examines the challenges of making medical care safer for patients.

Other awards and recognition

 Gold Foundation Medical Humanism Award
 Fellow of the American College of Physicians.
 McGovern award by the American Medical Writers Association for "preeminent contributions to medical communication."  
 Honorary Doctorate of Humane Letters from Curry College
Editor's Prize for Nonfiction by The Missouri Review.

Personal life
Ofri lives in New York City, and has three children. She studies cello.

Publications

References

External links
Danielle Ofri’s Homepage
Bellevue Literary Review

Writers from New York City
American pharmacologists
Women pharmacologists
New York University Grossman School of Medicine alumni
New York University faculty
Physicians from New York City
American medical writers
Women medical writers
Jewish American writers
Jewish physicians
Living people
1965 births
Scientists from New York (state)
21st-century American Jews